Boris Dmitrievich Grekov (in Mirgorod, Poltava Governorate, Russian Empire – 9 September 1953 in Moscow) was a Russian and Soviet historian noted for his comprehensive studies of Kievan Rus and the Golden Horde. He was a member of the Soviet Academy of Sciences (1934) and several foreign academies, as well as Director of the Russian History Institute in Moscow.

Grekov entered Warsaw University in 1901 but moved to the Moscow University four years later. During the pre-revolutionary years he researched the economic and social history of the Novgorod Republic (published in 1914).

Grekov was accused of participating in the White Movement in the Crimea during the civil war, and in 1930, his son was arrested in connection with the "Platonov Affair" and sent to the Solovki Islands Penal Colony. Both of these facts were widely known in the 1930s, and this led Grekov to make wide-ranging concessions to the official ideology during the Stalin Purges and, according to A. H. Plakhonin, to write scholarship "on order" for the regime.

At this time, he turned toward the study of Kievan Rus' and became known as an opponent of the Ukrainian historian Mykhailo Hrushevsky, who claimed the heritage of Kievan Rus' primarily for modern Ukraine. His major work, Kievan Rus' appeared in 1939 and was the first of three of his works to win the Stalin Prize. In this work, steeped in Marxist–Leninist ideology, he stressed the agricultural rather than commercial basis of the economy of this polity and argued that the heritage of Kievan Rus' was equally shared by modern Russia, Ukraine, and Belarus.

Grekov's extensive research on Kievan Rus' provided insights into the economic and cultural development of medieval Rus' during the period of the Tatar domination. He summarized these findings in Culture of Kiev Rus (1944) and Russian Peasants from the Most Ancient Times to the Seventeenth Century (1946). But his most lasting work (and the one which is still regularly reprinted) was Golden Horde, written in collaboration with Alexander Yakubovsky and first published in 1937. The second (and now classical) edition appeared in 1950 under the title Golden Horde and Its Downfall.

Grekov also gave considerable attention to the collection and publication of primary sources, especially chronicles. His student, Vladimir Pashuto, carried this work forward and began the collection of foreign sources for the medieval period in the history of the Eastern Slavs.

In December 2022 the Akademika (Boris) Grekov street in Kyiv, Ukraine was renamed to (Righteous Among the Nations)  street.

References

A. H. Plakhonin, Article "Hrekov, Borys  Dmytrovych," in Entsyklopediia istorii Ukrainy, vol. II (Kyiv, 2004), pp. 189–90.
The content of this page derives in part from the Great Soviet Encyclopedia article on the same subject.

1882 births
1953 deaths
20th-century Russian historians
People from Myrhorod
Academicians of the USSR Academy of Architecture
Full Members of the USSR Academy of Sciences
Foreign Members of the Bulgarian Academy of Sciences
Moscow State University alumni
Academic staff of Perm State University
Academic staff of Tavrida National V.I. Vernadsky University
Third convocation members of the Supreme Soviet of the Soviet Union
Stalin Prize winners
Recipients of the Order of Lenin
Recipients of the Order of the Red Banner of Labour
Recipients of the Order of Saint Stanislaus (Russian), 2nd class
Recipients of the Order of Saint Stanislaus (Russian), 3rd class
Recipients of the Order of St. Anna, 3rd class
Historians from the Russian Empire
Russian medievalists
Soviet archivists
Soviet historians
Soviet medievalists
Burials at Novodevichy Cemetery
Academic staff of Herzen University